Robert Grafton (fl. 1386–1390), of Shrewsbury, Shropshire, was an English politician.

Family
Grafton's family originated from Grafton, a hamlet near Shrewsbury. His wife was Benedicta, and they had three sons.

Career
He was a Member (MP) of the Parliament of England for Shrewsbury in
1386, September 1388 and January 1390.

References

English MPs 1386
Politicians from Shropshire
14th-century births
Year of death missing
English MPs January 1390
English MPs September 1388